Oracle is the second album by the Canadian metal band Kittie, released in 2001 by independent label Artemis Records. The album shows a change in the band's sound, displaying more death metal influences. It was the only album to feature bassist Talena Atfield before she departed in 2002.

Background

After finishing their schedule on the 2001 SnoCore Tour, the band planned on returning to the same basement where they recorded their first album, to begin a work on a sophomore effort. In August 2001, guitarist Fallon Bowman left Kittie.

Lead guitarist and vocalist Morgan Lander noted how the band members were only 14 years old when writing their debut album and that "We haven’t written in 4 or 5 years." She acknowledged a change in influence from their early days, stating, "Then we listened to bands like Nirvana, Silverchair, and Alice in Chains. Now we listen to stuff like Cannibal Corpse and Nile." However, the band would continue to write in the same fashion by first composing the music and then using that "as the backdrop behind the vocals."

Morgan Lander explained the album title saying "An oracle speaks of truth, and sort of foresees the future," says Morgan. Morgan then said:

Commercial performance

The album debuted at #57 in the Billboard Top 200, selling 33,000 copies. By 2004, it had sold 209,000 copies in the US. The music video for "What I Always Wanted" received heavy airplay on the MTV2 and MuchMusic channels. The album peaked at #121 on the Official Top UK Albums Chart. It also peaked at #91 on the Official German Albums chart.

Track listing

Personnel
 Morgan Lander: vocals, guitar, piano
 Mercedes Lander: drums
 Talena Atfield: bass

Production
Siegfried Meier - second engineer

Charts

References

External links

2001 albums
Albums produced by Garth Richardson
Kittie albums
Artemis Records albums
Nu metal albums by Canadian artists
Groove metal albums